Mosiah priority is a theory about the creation of the Book of Mormon arguing that the original manuscript began not with 1 Nephi (found at the beginning of the Book of Mormon), but midway through, starting with Mosiah. According to Mosiah priority, after the text of Mosiah through the end of the Book of Mormon was transcribed, Joseph Smith returned to the beginning and transcribed 1 Nephi through Words of Mormon. Mosiah priority is the most widely held solution to questions regarding the sequence of the English text.

Priority in the Book of Mormon
The original transcription of the Book of Mormon by scribe Martin Harris was interrupted by the loss of the original manuscript.  The question about the subsequent workflow is known as the problem of priority in the Book of Mormon.

Lost 116 pages

The "Lost 116 pages" were the first manuscript pages of the Book of Mormon, and these were entrusted to scribe Martin Harris and subsequently lost.  Smith subsequently announced a revelation:

Behold I say unto you, that you shall not translate again those words which have gone forth out of your hands; for behold, they shall not lie any more against those words; for behold, if you should bring forth the same words, they would say that you have lied; that you have pretended to translate, but that you have contradicted your words; and behold they would publish this, and satan would harden the hearts of the people, to stir them up to anger against you, that they might not believe my words

In a preface to the 1830 edition of the Book of Mormon, Smith writes of the Lost 116 pages:

 I translated, by the gift and power of God, and caused to be written, one hundred and sixteen pages, the which I took from the Book of Lehi, which was an account abridged from the plates of Lehi, by the hand of Mormon; which said account, some person or persons have stolen and kept from me, notwithstanding my utmost exertions to recover it again -- and being commanded of the Lord that I should not translate the same over again, for Satan had put it into their hearts to tempt the Lord their God, by altering the words that they did read contrary from that which I translated and caused to be written; and if I should bring forth the same words again, or, in other words, if I should translate the same over again, they would publish that which they had stolen, and Satan would stir up the hearts of this generation, that they might not receive this work: but behold the Lord said unto me, I will not suffer that Satan shall accomplish his evil design in this thing: therefore thou shalt translate from the plates of Nephi, until ye come to that which ye have translated, which ye have retained; and behold ye shall publish it as a record of Nephi; and thus I will confound those who have altered my words. I will not suffer that they shall destroy my work;

1 Nephi priority
Faced with the loss of the 116 page manuscript, creation of a second manuscript began.

The theory of 1 Nephi Priority argues that after the loss of the original 116-page manuscript, the transcription process returned to the beginning of the Golden Plates narrative, starting over at the beginning with 1 Nephi. Proponents of 1 Nephi Priority included multiple 20th century authors.

Mosiah priority
The theory of Mosiah priority argues that after the loss of the original 116-page manuscript, transcription continued in narrative order, beginning with Mosiah and continuing to Moroni.  Afterwards, the transcription process turned to replacing the beginning of the Book of Mormon (1 Nephi to Words), roughly corresponding to the material in the Lost 116 pages.

Historical evidence

The title page of the Book of Mormon, which Joseph Smith said was found at the very end of Moroni's record, had been completed before 11 Jun 1829.  But evidence shows that the translation process still continued after this date.  Metcalfe also argues that because the title page mentions Mormon's abridgment and Ether, but not Nephi's record, this suggests that 1 Nephi had not yet been translated.

For some parts of the Book of Mormon text, likely dates of transcription have been identified.  This includes the restarting of translation work (referred to in D&C 10 in April–May 1829), teachings on baptism in 3 Nephi (referred to in D&C 13 on May 15, 1829), and a prophecy of the Three Witnesses in 2 Nephi 27 (referred to in D&C 17 in June 1829).  The times when these passages were produced corresponds with a sequence and a consistent pace of translation beginning at Mosiah in April 1829 and then arriving at 1 Nephi later that summer.

The pages of the original manuscript containing 1 Nephi are written in Oliver Cowdery's handwriting.  However, the first scribes were Joseph's wife Emma and his younger brother Samuel, suggesting that the original manuscript was not begun at 1 Nephi.  In addition, a scribe's handwriting in 1 Nephi is believed to be from John Whitmer, who was not involved until late in the translation process, after Joseph Smith had moved back to Fayette, New York.

The beginning of the Book of Mosiah appears to be missing, since it lacks an introduction (unlike all the other abridged books) and its beginning was originally marked as Chapter 3 in the printer's manuscript.  This suggests that an earlier beginning to Mosiah may have been in the lost 116-page manuscript and that the current Book of Mosiah immediately continues from that lost text.

Textual evidence
Textual evidence for Mosiah priority includes the shift in word choices over the transcription process.  Scholars examine pairs of words that are roughly synonymous, such as:
 "therefore" and "wherefore."
 "whoso" and "whosoever."
 "inasmuch" and "insomuch."
More recent research has shown that the following graph is partly an artifact resulting from the fact that it is based on total hits in each book. However, Alma has c. 85,000 words, Mosiah c. 30,000, 1 Nephi c. 23,000, and Mormon under 10,000. Other books are smaller. A valid graph must use data standardized for book size. In a recent study, Eccel standardized the data on 5,000 words. The resulting graph showed no gradual shift in style. To the contrary, the radical shift from the Nephi group to the Mosiah-Helaman group, supports the study of John Hilton, which concluded that Nephi and Alma could not have been authored by the same person.

Frequency Therefore vs Wherefore in the Book of Mormon (occurrences per 1000 words)

"Therefore" predominates from Mosiah to Moroni.  "Wherefore" predominates from Ether to Words.

Computational studies
A 2008 computational study claimed to note patterns which support Mosiah priority, although its methodology is not without criticism.

Reception
Mosiah priority is widely accepted by Book of Mormon researchers and in scholarly publications about the text.

References

Book of Mormon studies
Textual criticism